Peiyuan Subdistrict is a subdistrict of Changning City in Hunan, China. It was one of 4 subdistricts approved to establish in 2008. The subdistrict of Peiyuan has 6 villages and 4 communities under its jurisdiction.

History
The subdistrict of Peiyuan was approved to form　from 7 villages of Dali, Tangshan, Huxi, Lianhua, Liangjiang, Huangzhi and Jinqiao, 3 communities of Chengxi, Xishang and Taojiang of the former Yiyang Town in 2008, named after the Tower of Peiyuan.

Subdivisions
Through the merger of village-level divisions in 2016, its divisions was reduced to 6 from 10. The subdistrict of Peiyuan has 3 communities and 3 villages under its jurisdiction.

3 villages
 Huxi Village
 Lianhua Village
 Peiyuan Village

3 communities	
 Liangjiang Community
 Taojiang Community
 Xishang Community

References

External links
 Official Website

Changning, Hunan
Subdistricts of Hunan